This article shows the rosters of all participating teams at the women's basketball tournament at the 2020 Summer Olympics in Tokyo.

Group A

Canada

Canada's women's basketball team of 12 athletes was announced on June 30, 2021.

Serbia

South Korea

The roster was announced on 23 June 2021.

Spain

A 14-player roster was announced on 7 July 2021. The final squad was revealed on 11 July 2021.

Group B

France

A 15-player roster was announced on 1 July 2021. The final roster was revealed on 5 July 2021.

Japan

The roster was announced on 1 July 2021.

Nigeria
A 15-player roster was announced on 6 July 2021. The final roster was released on 19 July 2021.

United States

The roster was announced on 21 June 2021.

Group C

Australia

The roster was announced on 26 May 2021. Liz Cambage withdrew before the tournament on 16 July 2021 and replaced by Sara Blicavs.

Belgium

The roster was announced on 4 July 2021.

China

The roster was announced on 3 July 2021.

Puerto Rico

The roster was announced on 8 July 2021.

References

External links
 – Tokyo 2020 Olympic Coverage

2020
rosters
Basketball Women's